Naale  is a Malayalam language film. It was released in 2008.

Cast
Shobana
Sukumari
Dileep
Sai Kumar

References

2008 films
2000s Malayalam-language films